The Albert Academy (AA) is a secondary school in Freetown, Sierra Leone.

The school's motto is Esse Quam Vederi (Rather to be than to Seem). It is situated at Berry Street in Freetown. Among its alumni are Sierra Leone's first Prime Minister, Sir Milton Margai and Sierra Leone's first president, Siaka Stevens and Chernor Bah.

The school is sometimes referred to as Mende Man College reflecting the fact that over the years students from the Mende tribe in Sierra Leone were overrepresented. AA students have also been referred to as Okamory Boys due to the area in which the school is located in Freetown. However, the school has students from everywhere in Sierra Leone and it is not restricted to any tribe.

Although the school has a Christian tradition, the United Methodist Church, students from all religious background can attend. It has alumni associations in the UK, USA and Freetown. The alumni associations make contributions to the school including, for example, giving scholarships and grants to students.

History 
A girls' school had been established in the British colony of Sierra Leone in Moyamba in 1900, and it was decided to establish a similar boys' school. The UBC mission was responsible for finding land for the school, and originally proposed locating it in Shenge, the home of missionary Ira Albert. Eventually, however, the board decided that Shenge was too small, so they established the school in the colony's capital at Freetown.

The Albert Academy was founded on 4 October 1904, and was named after Ira Albert, who had recently been killed in a boating accident. When the academy was founded, it had just one teacher, a Mr L Turner, and four pupils. The first principal was Reverend Raymond P. Dougherty, with Edwin Hursh as vice principal. The original location was in Freetown's East Street.

In 1907, the academy relocated to its present location on Berry Street.

Notable alumni
Sir Milton Margai, lead Sierra Leone to independence and became prime minister from 1961 to 1964
 Siaka Stevens, First Executive President
 Dr. Karefa Smart
 Dr. Abdulai Conteh former Attorney General and Vice President 
 Prof. VJV Mambu
 Dr Ibrahim Stevens Deputy Governor Central Bank of Sierra Leone

Notes

References

External links
Albert Academy Alumni Association, Washington DC Chapter

Secondary schools in Sierra Leone
Schools in Freetown
1904 establishments in Sierra Leone
Educational institutions established in 1904